The following is a list of songs written about Lucknow, a city in Uttar Pradesh province of India:

"Tera Hoke Rahoon" - a song from 2017 Bollywood film Bahen Hogi Teri 
"Jhalla Walla" - a 2012 song by Shreya Ghoshal from film Ishaqzaade 
"Pareshaan" - another song from Ishaqzaade
"Rangreli" and "Mannar" - both songs sung by Shreya Ghoshal and Sonu Nigam in Dawat-e-Ishq
"Schhol Ke Din" from Always Kabhi Kabhi
"Bullett Raja" - title song of Bullett Raja (2013)
"Suno Na Sangemarmar" - sung by Arijit Singh from Youngistan (2014)
"In Ankhon Ki Masti Ke" - sung by Asha Bhosle for Umrao Jaan (1981)

References

Lucknow
Culture of Uttar Pradesh
Songs about India
Songs
Lucknow in fiction